The Australian Minister for the Arts is responsible for creative industries and culture. It is currently held by Tony Burke in the Albanese ministry since 1 June 2022, following the Australian federal election in 2022.

The minister administers the portfolio through the Department of Infrastructure, Transport, Regional Development, Communications and the Arts.

List of arts ministers
The only minister before Simon Crean to have the title of Minister for the Arts was Bob McMullan between 24 March 1993 and 25 March 1994. However, "Arts" has appeared in several ministerial titles since Peter Howson was appointed Minister for the Environment, Aborigines and the Arts on 10 March 1971. The following individuals have been appointed as Minister for the Arts, or any of its precedent titles:

List of arts assistant ministers

References

External links
 

Arts